György Kiss is the name of 

 György Kiss (footballer) (born 1975), Hungarian football defender
 György Kiss (runner) (born 1936), Hungarian middle- and long-distance runner
  (1852–1919), Hungarian sculptor